Sacré Géranium is the first album of the Dutch singer-songwriter Dick Annegarn, released in  1974.

All songs are in French and were composed by the singer. It took its name from the first song, "Sacré Géranium", which was also a hit.

Track list 
Sacré géranium (2 min 41)
La transformation (3 min 39)
Le grand dîner (3 min 42)
Bruxelles (2 min 28)
Volet fermé (1 min 50)
Faubert Waltz (2 min 32)
Bébé éléphant (2 min 37)
L'univers (3 min 15)
L'institutrice (2 min 24)
L'Orage (4 min 57)
Ubu (1 min 36)

Production
Lyrics and music : Dick Annegarn
Arrangements : Jean Musy
Sound : Paul Houdebine assisté de Philippe Puig
Artistic direction : Jacques Bedos

1974 debut albums
French-language albums
Dick Annegarn albums